Muscovado is a type of partially refined to unrefined sugar with a strong molasses content and flavour, and dark brown in colour. It is technically considered either a non-centrifugal cane sugar or a centrifuged, partially refined sugar according to the process used by the manufacturer. Muscovado contains higher levels of various minerals than processed white sugar, and is considered by some to be healthier. Its main uses are in food and confectionery, and the manufacture of rum and other forms of alcohol. The largest producer and consumer of muscovado is India.

Terminology
The English name "muscovado" is derived from a corruption of Portuguese  (unrefined sugar). The Indian English names for this type of sugar are khandsari and khand (sometimes spelled khaand).

There is no legal definition of muscovado, and no international standards for it such as Codex Alimentarius or Protected Designation of Origin. This has led to manufacturers calling various sugar products "muscovado", and has led to confusion between muscovado and brown sugar, and even with jaggery.

History

The earliest known production of crystalline sugar began in northern India, after the introduction of sugarcane by Austronesian traders from Island Southeast Asia at around 1000 BCE. However, the exact date of the first cane sugar production is unclear. The earliest evidence of sugar production comes from ancient Sanskrit and Pali texts.

The early modern era, which saw the European colonization of the Americas and Asia, also led to a rapid increase in sugar production. Sugar plantations were established in numerous places colonized by European nations, such as islands in the Indian Ocean, the West Indies and South and North America. Labor for these plantations were typically provided by indentured servants, slaves or kidnapped Pacific Islanders, which saw the rise of the transatlantic and Indian Ocean slave trades to supply enslaved laborers to cash crop plantations (including those producing sugar). Sugarcane was typically refined into raw sugar or distilled into rum on colonial plantations or sent elsewhere to be processed.

Raw sugar was brought to port in a variety of purities that could be sold either as raw sugar directly to market for producing alcohol, or as muscovado exported sugar refineries in Europe and the Americas. In 19th-century Europe, raw sugars that had been refined enough to lose most of their molasses content were termed raw and deemed higher quality, while poor quality sugars with a high molasses content were referred to as muscovado, though the term brown sugar was sometimes used interchangeably.

Production

Production methods
Muscovado is made from the juice of sugar cane that is evaporated until crystallisation occurs. The viscous suspension of crystals and mother liquor (molasses) is called massecuite. In the 19th century several techniques were used for sugar production. Muscovado is today produced by three main methods:
 The manual production method is to crystallise (granulate) massecuite by cooling it in pans and continuously shearing it by stirring with a large spatula (typically used in India) or by pressing it with the feet (typically used in Africa).
 The industrial centrifuge method invented in late 18th to early 19th century, in which massecuite is crystallised using a centrifuge to separate a crystal-rich mush that is drained of its molasses in a vessel under gravity.
 Modern industrial methods using a spray drier.

Massecuite is also used in the production of jaggery, in which it is set into moulds directly.

Producer nations
Total global production is 10 to 11 million tons annually by 20 nations. The largest producer is India (58%), followed by Colombia (14%), Myanmar (9%), Pakistan (6%), Brazil (4%), Bangladesh (3%) and China (3%).

In India, most khand (muscovado) is produced by 150 small to medium scale private manufacturers overseen by the Khadi and Village Industries Commission. These producers use traditional chemical-free organic manual shearing methods, each operating between 100 and 120 days per year with a typical capacity of between 200 and 350 tons of sugar cane per day. The largest producing states in India are Maharashtra (58%), Bihar (6%), Karnataka (5%), Madhya Pradesh and Chhattisgarh (6%).

In Mauritius muscovado is produced by centrifuging massecuite, from which the molasses is left to drain naturally.

In the Philippines muscovado may be generated by any of the three methods. In the past, muscovado was one of the prominent export commodities of the Philippines, especially from the Negros region from the 19th century until the late 1970s.

The production of muscovado in the Philippines, Barbados, and elsewhere had experienced a long period of decline when large mills took over sugar production from small farmers with small mills. In recent years an increased consumer interest in healthy and organic foods has revived interest in muscovado, creating a new market for small mills.

Nutrition
When produced under regulated conditions muscovado is nutritionally richer than sugars, and retains more of the natural minerals in sugar cane juice, as shown in the following nutritional analysis (per 100 g):
 Total mineral salts 740 mg max.
 Phosphorus (P) 3.9 mg max.
 Calcium (Ca) 85 mg max.
 Magnesium (Mg) 23 mg max.
 Potassium (K) 100 mg max.
 Iron (Fe) 1.3 mg max.
 Calories 383 kCal

Uses

Food and confectionery
Muscovado is used as an ingredient in food and confectionery, and as a sweetener in hot beverages.  It is very dark brown and is slightly coarser and stickier than most brown sugars. Muscovado takes its flavor and color from its source, sugarcane juice. It offers good resistance to high temperatures and has a reasonably long shelf life.

Muscovado sugar can be substituted for brown sugar in most recipes by slightly reducing the liquid content of the recipe.

The use of khand in India in making sweets has been traced to at least 500 BC, when both raw and refined sugar were used.

Along with gur, khandsari unrefined sugar is India's traditional sweetener, commonly used in traditional recipes for masala chai (spiced Indian tea), eating with roti by mixing with melted ghee, traditional Indian sweets that require sugar such as kheer (Indian rice pudding), gur or khand chawal (sweetened rice) or laddu.

Muscovado is often used to sweeten coffee.

Alcohol
A significant proportion of India's production of Khandsari (muscovado) is used for the illicit production of desi daru, a distilled alcoholic drink.

Ayurveda medicine
Khandsari (muscovado) is used in traditional Ayurveda medicine to aid blood purification, digestion, bone health and the lungs.

See also

 Sugar
 Brown sugar
 Jaggery
 Rock candy
 Indian Institute of Sugarcane Research
 Indian Sugar Mills Association

References

External links
 Video: Centrifugal method of Khand production in India
 Video: Gur (Jaggary) and Khand (Muscovado) making in India using traditional method.

Sugars
Molasses